Fat Slags is a 2004 British independent gross out comedy film based on the Viz comic characters of the same name. The creators had no editorial control over the film. Despite the relative popularity of the comic strip and its celebrity cameos, the film was panned by critics.

Plot

The film chronicles the (mis)adventures of Sandra (Fiona Allen) and Tracey (Sophie Thompson), the famously vulgar and crass Fat Slags of the title. The pair leave their hometown of Fulchester for London, shagging and boozing their way to fame and fortune. On the day they arrive in London, internationally-renowned billionaire Sean Cooley (Jerry O'Connell) suffers a blow to the head that renders him temporarily insane. When he spots Sandra and Tracey on a daytime chat show, he falls for their larger-than-life outlook. A media sensation is brought about when Cooley forces fashion designer Fidor Konstantin (James Dreyfus) to base his upcoming collection on the Fat Slags. 
Sandra and Tracey take the United Kingdom by storm, hitting #1 in the record charts and inadvertently winning the Turner Prize. 
As far as the press is concerned, fat is the new black. This new trend leads to Cooley's assistant, Paige, gaining major weight. 
Throughout their journey into the world of fame, the Slags maintain their unique and endearing vulgarity, coupled with an innocence that draws the British public to their cause. 
But in private, jealousy drives a wedge between them as they vie for Cooley's attentions. 
Only when he regains his mental faculties and turns on the girls do they realise that their friendship is the only real thing they have in their mad new world.

Cast

Production
In August 2003, it was announced a feature film adaptation of Fat Slags was slated to begin shooting scheduled August 10. Fat Slags was part of a wave of sex comedies slated for production in the U.K. alongside other entries such as Sex Lives of the Potato Men, School for Seduction, and attempted Carry On revival Carry On London which was soon cancelled.

Reception

Critical response
Fat Slags received near unanimously negative reviews and was panned by critics. John Plunkett, writing for The Guardian, stated "It has plenty of gross-out stuff, but chucked in with an eerie lack of enjoyment or conviction. Depression seeps out of the screen like carbon monoxide." Adrian Hennigan for the BBC wrote "This painfully slapdash comedy - with caricatures instead of characters - lurches from one crude, staggeringly inept set-piece to another with the subtlety of a three-legged elephant."
Graham Dury, the comic strip's creator, stated that Rita, Sue and Bob Too was a more accurate live action depiction of the comic book characters. Dury told the BBC that he was so appalled by the film, he would stop drawing the strips, though the strip did not in fact stop. 
British film historian I.Q. Hunter, discussing the question "What is the worst British film ever made?" listed Fat Slags as one of the contenders for that title.

References

External links
 
 

2004 films
2004 comedy films
British comedy films
Films based on British comics
Films based on comic strips
Films shot in London
Live-action films based on comics
British independent films
2004 independent films
2000s English-language films
2000s British films
English-language comedy films